Peter Barr (9 July 1861 – 21 March 1951) was a New Zealand accountant. He was born in Dunedin on 9 July 1861. He was instrumental in founding the Institute of Accountants of New Zealand in Dunedin in 1894 which became the New Zealand Society of Accountants with the passing of the New Zealand Society of Accountants Act 1908. He also agitated to get accountancy degrees status in New Zealand.

In 2003, Barr was posthumously inducted into the New Zealand Business Hall of Fame.

References

1861 births
1951 deaths
New Zealand accountants
People from Dunedin
New Zealand Congregationalists
Dunedin City Councillors